Badol Khondokar (born 27 May 1960) is a Bangladeshi film director and producer.

Biography
Khondokar was born on 27 May 1960. He directed films like Swapner Prithibi, Prithibi Tomar Amar, Sagorika, Abar Ekti Juddho, Prem Korechhi Besh Korechhi and Bidrohi Padma. These films are selected for preservation in Bangladesh Film Archive. His last direction was Bidrohi Padma. It was released in 2006. He involved in producing films too.

Khondokar collected nomination form for Kurigram-3 in 2013 for the Tenth Jatiya Sangsad Election. Later, he withdrew his nomination form. He is the cultural advisor of the central committee of the Jatiyo Party.

Selected filmography
 Swapner Prthibi
 Bishwanetri
 Modhur Milon
 Prithibi Tomar Amar
 Sagorika
 Prem Korechhi Besh Korechhi
 Abar Ekti Juddho
 Bidrohi Padma

References

Living people
Bangladeshi film directors
Bangladeshi film producers
People from Kurigram District
1960 births
Jatiya Party politicians